Yrs or YRS may refer to:

People
 Yrsa, a tragic heroine of Scandinavian legend
Yahya Rahmat-Samii, Iranian engineer

Other uses
 Years
 Year-round school
 Young Rewired State, a series of British hacking events
 Ytterbium dirhodium disilicide, an intermetallic
Yorkshire Ridings Society, England
 Red Sucker Lake Airport, Manitoba, Canada (by IATA code)

See also
YR (disambiguation)